Pierre Breton  (born October 3, 1966) is a Canadian Liberal politician who was elected as a Member of Parliament in the House of Commons of Canada to represent the federal electoral district of Shefford during the 2015 Canadian federal election. He was defeated in the 2019 Canadian federal election.

Breton was born in Granby, Quebec, and attended the Université du Québec à Montréal, earning a degree in business administration.  He worked for a number of companies, including Bombardier and Viasystems Canada.  From 2003 until his election to Parliament, he was a business partner in the human resources department for the Société des alcools du Québec.

He began his involvement in politics by volunteering on the campaigns of Jean Lapierre, the Liberal MP for Shefford from 1979 to 1993.  In 2005, he was elected as an independent to the city council of Granby, and held that position until his election to the House of Commons.

Electoral record

References

External links
 Official Website

Liberal Party of Canada MPs
Living people
Members of the House of Commons of Canada from Quebec
Université du Québec à Montréal alumni
Quebec municipal councillors
People from Granby, Quebec
21st-century Canadian politicians
1966 births